The International Ombudsman Institute (IOI), established in 1978, is the only global organisation for the cooperation of more than 200 independent Ombudsman institutions operating on a local, regional and national level from more than 100 countries worldwide. The Ombudsman of Western Australia, Chris Field, is the current President of the IOI since May 2021. Werner Amon, Chair of the Austrian Ombudsman Board, is the IOI's Secretary General since July 2019.

The role of Ombudsman institutions is to protect the people against the violation of rights, abuse of powers, unfair decisions and maladministration. They play an increasingly important role in improving public administration while making the government's actions more open and its administration more accountable to the public.

In its effort to focus on good governance and capacity building, the IOI supports its members in a threefold way: training, research and regional subsidies for projects. The IOI is organised in six regional chapters (Africa, Asia, Australasia & Pacific, Europe, the Caribbean & Latin America and North America) and has three working languages (English, French and Spanish).

The General Secretariat is located in Vienna (Austria) and is run by the Austrian Ombudsman Board (Volksanwaltschaft) since 2009.

Presidents
, Sweden, 1984
Bernard Frank, United States, 1985–
Stephen Owen, Canada, 1990
Sir John Robertson, New Zealand, 1992–1994
Jorge Maiorano, Argentina
, Netherlands, −1999
Sir Brian Elwood, New Zealand, 1999–2002
Clare Lewis, 2002–2004
Bill Angrick, United States, 2004–2010
, Sweden, President in 2010
Dame Beverley Wakem, New Zealand, November 2010 – October 2014
 John Walters, Namibia, October 2014 – November 2016
 Peter Tyndall, Ireland, November 2016 – May 2021 
 Chris Field, Australia, May 2021 – present

References

External links
 International Ombudsman Institute

International organisations based in Vienna
Ombudsman organizations